Thamilar Senthamarai Tamil Entertainment Television (TET) is a premier 24-hour HD Tamil Channel Broadcasting company in North America. From their launch in December 2012, TET has become an undeniable heavy-weight media presence in the South Asian community. As a new media company solemnly based on entertainment programming, the network aims to provide unique programming covering the latest trends and events that impact the ever growing Tamil Canadian population.
Headquartered in Toronto, Canada; TET provides a mix of local and large-scale international productions for viewers of all ages. They are, at the core, a community based company and take mindful steps to promote Tamil talent and art. In addition, the network airs in-demand shows that are currently not

References

Asian-Canadian culture in Toronto
Newspapers published in Toronto
Multicultural and ethnic newspapers published in Canada
Weekly newspapers published in Ontario
Tamil-Canadian culture
Publications established in 1994
1994 establishments in Ontario

| web            =